Puposky is an unincorporated community in Durand Township, Beltrami County, Minnesota, United States.

Puposky was officially founded on September 26, 1905. The railroad was coming through, and a Post Office also started that same year.

The town is three blocks long, has a post office (zip code 56667), a town hall, and a church (with cemetery).

Population
The 2010 state census listed Durand Township's population at 175, with no specific information on the town of Puposky itself. The sign outside the town lists the population at 89, but this number has remained static for several decades and is arguably inaccurate. In 2011, local sources said the population has been as low as 37 residents in the past.

Origin
Puposky's name is derived from an Ojibwe word which means "shaking ground" referring to the swampy terrain.

References

External links
 Community of Puposky

Unincorporated communities in Beltrami County, Minnesota
Unincorporated communities in Minnesota